Joseph Hutchinson (1902–1988) was a British biologist (1842–1924).

Joseph Hutchinson may also refer to:
 J. H. Hutchinson (Joseph H. Hutchinson, 1860–1934), Lieutenant Governor of Idaho
 Joseph Turner Hutchinson (1850–1924), Chief Justice of Ceylon
 Joseph Hutchinson (Lord Mayor of Dublin) (1852–1928), Irish politician and Lord Mayor of Dublin

See also
 Joseph Hutcheson (disambiguation)